Becky Snyder or Becky Snider may refer to:

Becky Snyder of ABC-CLIO
Becky Snyder of Annie (musical)
Becky Snider, fictional character in Goodbye World